Doicești is a commune in Dâmbovița County, Muntenia, Romania, with a population of 4,686 people. It is composed of a single village, Doiceşti.

Points of interest
Doicești Power Station

References

Communes in Dâmbovița County
Localities in Muntenia